The FNAB-43 is an Italian designed and developed submachine gun manufactured from 1943 to 1945. The first prototype was built in 1942 and the ~1,000 built by the FNA-B according to Ian McCollum of Forgotten Weapons (Fabbrica Nazionale d'Armi di Brescia, "Brescia National Arms Factory", hence the name) were issued to German and Italian RSI (Repubblica Sociale Italiana) units fighting in Northern Italy. The FNAB-43 was an expensive weapon to manufacture as it used extensive milling and precision engineering in its manufacture.

Description

The FNAB-43 uses a lever-delayed blowback system, firing from the closed bolt position. The bolt is a two-piece unit with a pivoted lever interposed between bolt head and body. Upon firing, the bolt head retracts, and begins to rotate the lever; the base of which is against a lug in the body. This lever is pivoted to delay the opening movement in order to allow the bullet to leave the barrel. The breech pressure then drops before the lever has completed its rotation. The movement of the lever then presses the free end against the bolt body and accelerates the bolt's movement to the rear. The base of the lever then pulls clear of the lug, and the whole bolt unit continues to recoil as one piece. Upon returning, the lever again engages the lug and pivots forward; in doing so, removing a coupling which allows the firing pin to move only when the bolt is fully forward (in battery). This unusual and complicated system allows the rate of fire to be maintained at a practical 400 rpm without having to use heavier or stronger internal components.

The FNAB-43 also utilizes a muzzle brake and compensator built into the barrel shroud. The magazine well is hinged so that the magazine can lie beneath the barrel similarly to the French MAT-49. The single metal bar stock can be folded upwards, rendering the weapon more compact.

Notes

References
 Hogg, Ian (1978). The Encyclopedia of Infantry Weapons of World War II. London: Arms & Armour Press. .
 Hogg, Ian; Weeks, John S. (2000). Military Small Arms of the 20th Century. 7th edition. Iola, WI: Krause Publishing. .

External links
 Secundeguerre.net (French)
 Supreme Command (Italian)
 FNAB-43 at Security arms
 FNAB 43

9mm Parabellum submachine guns
Lever-delayed blowback firearms
Submachine guns of Italy
World War II infantry weapons of Italy
World War II submachine guns
Weapons and ammunition introduced in 1944